Parliamentary elections were held in Azerbaijan on 1 November 2015. The result was a victory for the ruling New Azerbaijan Party, which won 69 of the 125 seats in the National Assembly amidst an opposition boycott.

Electoral system
The 125 members of the National Assembly were elected in single-member constituencies using the first-past-the-post system.

Campaign
The elections were boycotted by the major opposition parties, including Musavat, who accused the government of "massive violations".

Results

The results in constituency 90 (Agdash) were annulled due to irregularities after an appeal by two candidates; independent candidate Chingiz Asadullayev had been in the lead.

References

Parliamentary elections in Azerbaijan
Azerbaijan
Azerbaijan
Parliamentary election, 2015
Election and referendum articles with incomplete results